The 1992 Espirito Santo Trophy took place 24–27 September at Marine Drive Golf Club in Vancouver, British Columbia, Canada. 

It was the 15th women's golf World Amateur Team Championship for the Espirito Santo Trophy. The tournament was a 72-hole stroke play team event with 31 team entries, each with up to three players. The best two scores for each round counted towards the team total.

The Spain team won the Trophy and their second title, beating the combined team of Great Britain & Ireland by one stroke. Great Britain & Ireland earned the silver medal while the New Zealand team took the bronze on third place another eight strokes back.

The individual title went to Annika Sörenstam, Sweden, whose score of one under par, 287, was five strokes ahead of two players, who shared second place.

Teams 
31 teams entered the event and 30 of them completed the competition as team Costa Rica only completed three rounds. Each team had three players, except Hong Kong, which only had two.

Results 

Sources:

Individual leaders 
While there was no official leader board for the individual results, the order of individual placements was recognized in the official record book.

References

External links 
World Amateur Team Championships on International Golf Federation website

Espirito Santo Trophy
Espirito Santo Trophy
Espirito Santo Trophy
Espirito Santo Trophy
Espirito Santo Trophy